Romain Villa (born 27 April 1985 in Charleville-Mézières, Ardennes) is a French former road and cyclo-cross cyclist.

Major results

Cyclo-cross
2000–2001
 1st  National Novice Championships
2001–2002
 1st  National Junior Championships
2002–2003
 1st Overall Junior Coupe de France de cyclo-cross
2004–2005
 1st  National Under-23 Championships
 1st Overall Under-23 Coupe de France de cyclo-cross
2005–2006
 1st Overall Under-23 Coupe de France de cyclo-cross
2006–2007
 1st  National Under-23 Championships
 3rd  UCI Under-23 World Championships

Road
2007
 1st Stage 4 Tour Alsace
 10th La Côte Picarde

External links

1985 births
Living people
People from Charleville-Mézières
French male cyclists
Sportspeople from Ardennes (department)
Cyclists from Grand Est